Daniel Greene, born in 1960, is an American actor, best known for his role as Dwayne Cooley in the television series Falcon Crest, and as Paco Queruak in the 1986 action–sci fi movie Vendetta dal futuro.

Career 
Greene appeared in episodes of Alice, Dynasty, Three's Company, Matt Houston, Emerald Point N.A.S., The A-Team, Scarecrow and Mrs. King, Night Court, Remington Steele, L.A. Law, Santa Barbara and Matlock.

He also appeared in the films Weekend Warriors, Pulsebeat, Hands of Steel, Arthur 2: On the Rocks, Elvira, Mistress of the Dark, There's Something About Mary, Me, Myself & Irene, Shallow Hal and Stuck on You.

Filmography

Film

Television

External links

American male film actors
American male television actors
Living people
1956 births